National Student Rodeo is a freestyle kayaking event in the UK hosted by Leeds University Canoe Club.  The National Student Rodeo was the biggest freestyle kayaking competition in the world, with 670 entrants and over 1000 party goers from 36 universities at its peak. It was held annually at Holme Pierrepont (HPP) National Water Sports Centre in Nottingham.

Organisation
Despite the highly demanding nature of organising events such as this, the National Student Rodeo was always be organised and run by a group of willing and enthusiastic volunteers. The 'Rodeo Bosses' were responsible for not only booking the venue and getting universities to turn up, but also arranging camping, finding sponsors, promoting the event and organising the myriad other jobs necessary. Event safety, first aid, judging, commentary, bar staffing and general 'gophering' were all dealt with by happy, enthusiastic members of LUUCC, River Legacy and other volunteers.

The focus of the competition was always been on the "fun" aspect of the sport, in order to encourage participation from novice paddlers.  This was mirrored in the prize-giving ceremonies, where the best prizes were saved for the novice and intermediate categories. However this was not to say that competition in the expert finals was not fierce. Many of the UK's best freestyle paddlers have competed at the event, former and current GB Freestyle Team members, loads of sponsored team paddlers and even more up-and-coming talent. The now legendary NSR parties were thoroughly compered and DJ'd to death by the Extreme Events crew, with waffle, banter, gibberish and occasionally the odd bit of useful information from DJ's Al, Shifty, Disco Dave and Tea Boy Tom. Extreme Events retired from the Rodeo in 2016 after a decade of brilliance.

The 'National Student Rodeo' name harks back to the olden days of kayaking, when freestyle was referred to as 'rodeo'. Although a renaming was briefly considered in 2004, 'The Rodeo' has stayed true to its roots.

Format

The core events for the competition was as follows:

Extreme Slalom - All competitors for K1 and C1 (Men's and Women's) entered this event to be seeded for the heats.
Men's Novice K1
Men's Intermediate K1
Men's Expert K1
Women's Novice K1
Women's Intermediate K1
Women's Expert K1
C1
Squirt
Topo Duo
Open event

A "King of the Wave" invitational event was held in 2006 but this has not been continued - Jon Fuller remains the official NSR King of the Wave.

NSR MMX (2010) saw the introduction of 2 new events: 'Old Skool' replaced the traditional Open event and saw competitors hotdog it out in boats and kit pre-2000 with Dave Burne of York coming out on top. There was also in the introduction of the "Kukri Sofa Cross" which saw 80 competitors race down the course at Holme Pierrepont on inflatable sofas.

In 2020 a Boater X style event was organised by Matt Wallace. It saw a timed race with "le mans" start (starting on the bank outside of kayaks) and groups of competitors race to lap the course through slalom gates.

While the competition took up the daytime schedule of the Rodeo, most students attended for the parties that took place on the Friday and Saturday night in the rugby club and marquee. While Friday night saw most of the universities arriving on site around 8PM, there was still plenty of fun to be had, and the bars stayed open until 2AM. However, Saturday was the big party organised by River Legacy, and saw all of the participants in their fancy dress finery attending. The festival atmosphere and legendary parties earn the Rodeo its place as the best student kayaking event of the year.

Other highlights of the weekend included 'Up-time': the time of day when all competitors are woken up from their slumbers (normally with the aid of a megaphone) to make sure that they attend their heats and fit into the hectic schedule that results from the fact that the organisers must fit in time for nearly 700 competitors to have at least two runs down the course.

Sponsorship

Long-term sponsors of the NSR included PGL, Desperate Measures canoe and kayak shop, Palm Equipment / Dagger Europe and Pyranha. Many of the sponsors donated hugely both in terms of money and prizes for the events, as well as providing food for the volunteers, supporting equipment for the Safety team, and essential supplies for the First Aid team.

Media 

Due to its size and reputation, the media presence surrounding the event evolved over time.  For example, in 2007 the event was trailed online with several humorous videos which can be found here.  The 2008 event was filmed by Liquid Satisfaction and was sold as a DVD.  This has since been released as a free podcast and both can be found at maxbilbow.com. The event has also been covered by Canoe & Kayak, Kayak Session, and The Paddler magazines.

Local news broadcasters have also covered the event - one such report can be seen here.

History 

1999 - ??

1998 - ??

1997 - Arran Stephenson and Rachel Sutton

1996 - Arran Stephenson and Paul Shelly

See also 
Freeboating
Playboating

External links 

Holme Pierrepont (HPP) National Water Sports Centre
2008 NSR DVD - Independent Playak Review

Canoeing and kayaking competitions in the United Kingdom
Sport in Nottinghamshire
Rushcliffe